Calvera is a city and comune in the province of Potenza, southern Italy.

Cities and towns in Basilicata